This is a list of notable people from Tegucigalpa, capital of Honduras.

Sport

Football

Jorge Álvarez, footballer
Luis Argeñal, footballer
Melissa Borjas, football referee
Miguel Castillo, footballer
Mauricio Castro, footballer
Michaell Chirinos, footballer
Juan Manuel Coello, footballer
Mario Chirinos, footballer
Emilson Cruz, footballer
Carlos Discua, footballer
José Escalante, footballer
Darwin Espinal, footballer
Harold Fonseca, footballer
Erick Fú, footballer
Óscar García, footballer
Boniek García, footballer  
Axel Gómez, footballer
Rigoberto Gómez, footballer
Amado Guevara, football manager
Luis Guifarro, footballer
Alex Güity, footballer
Astor Henríquez, footballer
Óscar Isaula, footballer
Emilio Izaguirre, footballer
Júnior Izaguirre, footballer
Allan Lalín, footballer
Alexander López, footballer
Denil Maldonado, footballer
Walter Martínez, footballer, born 1982
Walter Martínez, footballer, born 1991
Rubén Matamoros, footballer
Nerlin Membreño, footballer
Juan Ramón Mejía, footballer
David Molina, footballer
Ramón Núñez, footballer
César Obando, footballer
Rigoberto Padilla, footballer
Carlos Paes, footballer
Milton Palacios, footballer
Marcelo Pereira, footballer
Carlos Pineda, footballer
José Pinto, footballer
Brayan Ramírez, footballer
Cristian Raudales, footballer
Juan Raudales, footballer
José Reyes, footballer
Bryan Róchez, footballer
Luis Rodas, footballer
Diego Rodríguez, footballer
Roger Rojas, footballer
César Romero, footballer
Henry Romero, footballer
Joseph Rosales, footballer
Reynaldo Tilguath, footballer
Melvin Valladares, footballer
Edy Vásquez, footballer

Other sports
Arturo Córdoba, runner
Ana Galindo, swimmer
Iizzwa Medina, table tennis player
Bayron Molina, boxer
Luis Alonso Morán, judoka
Indira Murillo, journalist and basketballer
Karen Vilorio, swimmer

Politics
Óscar Acosta, writer and politician
Marlene Alvarenga, politician and pastor
Nasry Asfura, politician
Yadira Bendaña, journalist and politician
Rosa Elena Bonilla, politician
Armando Calidonio, politician
Rigoberto Chang Castillo, politician
María Martha Díaz Velásquez, politician
Mary Elizabeth Flores, journalist and politician
Matías Funes, academic and politician
Justo Herrera, politician
María Josefa Lastiri, former first lady of the Federal Republic of Central America, Honduras, El Salvador, and Costa Rica
Juan Fernando Lobo, television host and politician
Francisco Morazán, Central American head of state and unionist; namesake of the city's department
Salvador Nasralla, journalist and politician 
Mauricio Oliva, surgeon and politician
Waldina Paz, politician
Luis Redondo, politician
Jorge Arturo Reina Idiáquez, politician
Antonio Rivera Callejas, politician
Joaquín Rivera, politician and military leader
Erick Mauricio Rodríguez, politician
Ramón Rosa, journalist and politician
Elvin Santos, former vice president of Honduras
Beatriz Valle, dentist, diplomat, politician, and television presenter
Diego Vigil y Cocaña, last president of the Federal Republic of Central America
Mauricio Villeda, politician
José Rodolfo Zelaya, politician

Presidents of Honduras
Marco Aurelio Soto, former president of Honduras
Policarpo Bonilla, former president of Honduras
José Trinidad Cabañas, former president of Honduras
Tiburcio Carias Andino, former President of Honduras
Xiomara Castro, current president of Honduras
Miguel R. Dávila, former president of Honduras
Juan Francisco de Molina, first president of Honduras
Carlos Roberto Flores, former president of Honduras
Juan Manuel Gálvez, former president of Honduras
José Santos Guardiola, former president of Honduras 
Rafael Leonardo Callejas, former president of Honduras
Juan Lindo, former president of Honduras
Porfirio Lobo Sosa, former president of Honduras
Rafael López Gutiérrez, former president of Honduras 
Julio Lozano Díaz, former president of Honduras

Diplomats
Rosalinda Bueso, diplomat
Fernando Palma, diplomat and actor
Ricardo Zúñiga, American diplomat

Media, music and the arts
Oscar Acosta, writer
Eduardo Bähr, writer and actor
Rafael Casco, surrealist style artist
Horacio Castellanos Moya, author
Amanda Castro, poet
Augusto Coello, writer
Pompeyo del Valle, poet and journalist
Rocsi Diaz, television and radio personality
Édgar Flores, actor
Carlos Gutiérrez, writer and diplomat
Guadalupe Haertling, composer
Low Jack, DJ
Ana Jurka, journalist
Isabella Lovestory, singer
Augusto Monterroso, writer
Leticia de Oyuela, historian
Satcha Pretto, journalist
Roberto Sosa, poet
Lorena Vindel, actress 
Daniel Zacapa, actor
José Zúñiga, actor

Science and academia
Alba Alonso de Quesada, lawyer and academic
Pablo José Cámbar, academic and physician  
Marco Tulio Medina, neurologist and scientist
José Antonio Molina Rosito, botanist
Salvador Moncada, pharmocologist
Paul Carpenter Standley, American botanist
Julissa Villanueva, forensic pathologist

Business and law
Miguel Facussé Barjum, businessman
Miguel Estrada, attorney
Ana García Carías, lawyer and former first lady
Schucry Kafie, businessman
Dante Mossi, economist
Maya Selva, cigar maker and tobacco grower

Religion
Óscar Rodríguez Maradiaga, cardinal
José Trinidad Reyes, priest
Juan de Ugarte, missionary

Other
Joselina García, Miss Honduras 1997
Robert Seldon Lady, CIA agent
Gladys Lanza, human rights activist
Juan Matta-Ballesteros, drug trafficker

 
People from Tegucigalpa